Baraush is a sub-district located in Huth District, 'Amran Governorate, Yemen. Baraush had a population of 1032 according to the 2004 census.

References 

Sub-districts in Huth District